The 29K was a self-propelled anti-aircraft weapon used by the Soviet Union, consisting of a 76 mm air defense gun M1931 mounted on a YaG-10 truck.

History 
In August–September 1936, tests were carried out at the NIAP test site. The first vehicles entered service with Moscow Military District. ZSU 29-K took part in the parade on Red Square in Moscow. The first display of motorized anti-aircraft guns took place at a military parade in Moscow on 1 May 1934. Overall, sixty-one YaG-10 trucks were converted into 29K models. Modifications to the trucks included a reinforced undercarriage, rotating pedestal for the gun, and side boards replaced with semi-circular shields.

Specifications
Firing range = 14,600 m
Muzzle velocity = 815 m/s
Rate of fire = 10-20 rounds per minute
Aiming Device = Telescopic sight
Obstacle crossing capability = 20° slope
Wade depth = 0.65 m
Wheel configuration = 6×4

References

Further reading
 Alexander Shirokorad, Domestic semi-automatic anti-aircraft guns, "Equipment and weapons", No. 7, 1998.
 M. Svirin, “Stalin's self-propelled guns. History of the Soviet self-propelled guns 1919 - 1945. Yauza\EKSMO, Moscow, 2008.
 E. D. Kochnev, Cars of the Red Army 1918 - 1945., - M ..: Yauza: Eksmo, 2009. - S. 311.
 RGVA. F. 31811. Op. 2. D. 1159. L. 21. Basic tactical and technical data of the 76-mm anti-aircraft gun of the 1931 model, installed on the YAG-10.

Self-propelled anti-aircraft weapons of the Soviet Union
76 mm artillery
Military vehicles introduced in the 1930s